Fries's goby (Lesueurigobius friesii)  is a species of goby native to the Eastern Atlantic Ocean along the coasts of Europe and northern Africa as well as the Mediterranean Sea to the Sea of Marmara. This species can reach a length of  TL. The specific name honours the Swedish zoologist Bengt Fredrik Fries (1799-1839).

References

External links
 

Fries's goby
Marine fish of Europe
Fish of the North Sea
Fish of the Mediterranean Sea
Marine fauna of North Africa
Fries's goby